The Day of the Covenant is the day when Baháʼís celebrate the appointment of ʻAbdu'l-Bahá as the Centre of Baha'u'llah's Covenant. It occurs yearly on the 4th day of Speech (Qawl) which coincides with either November 25 or 26 depending on when Naw Ruz falls on that year. The 2020 date is November 25.

ʻAbdu'l-Bahá had stated that since May 23 was also the day that the Báb declared his mission, and should be exclusively associated with him, that that day should under no circumstances be celebrated as his day of birth. However, as the Baháʼís begged for a day to be celebrated as ʻAbdu'l-Bahá's birthday, he gave them November 26, 181 days after the ascension of Baháʼu'lláh, to be observed as the day of the appointment of the Centre of the Covenant. The holiday was originally known as the Jashn-i-Aʻzam in Persian (The Greatest Festival), because ʻAbdu'l-Bahá was known as the Greatest Branch; in the West, the holy day became known as the Day of the Covenant.

The day is one of two Baháʼí holy days where work does not need to be suspended.

Notes

Bahá'í holy days
November observances